Mathilde Neesgaard (born 2 April 1993) is a Danish handball player who currently plays for Aarhus United Elitehandball.

She is also a part of Denmark's national recruit team in handball.

References

1993 births
Living people
People from Herning Municipality
Danish female handball players
Sportspeople from the Central Denmark Region